Finzel is a census-designated place (CDP) in Garrett County, Maryland, United States. Finzel is located on Maryland Route 546 near the Pennsylvania border. As of the 2010 census, its population was 547.

Demographics

References

Census-designated places in Garrett County, Maryland
Census-designated places in Maryland